Jamie Crombie (born September 13, 1965 in Vermont, United States) is a former professional male squash player who represented Canada and later the United States during his career. He represented Canada at the 1985, 1987, 1989 & 1991 World Team Squash Championships. He reached a career-high world ranking of World No. 115 in October 2003 after having joined the Professional Squash Association in 2002.

External links
 

1965 births
Living people
American male squash players
Canadian male squash players
Pan American Games bronze medalists for Canada
Pan American Games medalists in squash
Squash players at the 1995 Pan American Games
Sportspeople from Vermont
Medalists at the 1995 Pan American Games